Conus habui is a species of sea snail, a marine gastropod mollusk in the family Conidae, the cone snails and their allies.

Like all species within the genus Conus, these snails are predatory and venomous. They are capable of "stinging" humans, therefore live ones should be handled carefully or not at all.

Description
The size of the shell attains 30 mm.

Distribution
This marine species occurs off Okinawa, Japan and off the Philippines

References

 Lan T.C. (2002) A new cone from Japan. Bulletin of Malacology [Malacological Society of Taiwan] 26: 1–4.
 Puillandre N., Duda T.F., Meyer C., Olivera B.M. & Bouchet P. (2015). One, four or 100 genera? A new classification of the cone snails. Journal of Molluscan Studies. 81: 1–23

External links
 The Conus Biodiversity website
 Gastropods.com: Asprella sulcata var. habui
 Cone Shells – Knights of the Sea

habui
Gastropods described in 2002